Loy Allen Bowlin (September 16, 1909 – June 14, 1995), also known as The Original Rhinestone Cowboy, was an outsider artist from McComb, Mississippi.  His artwork largely included bejeweling his clothing, Cadillac, home and even his dentures with thousands of rhinestones.  Bowlin's life and work have been acclaimed by various outsider art critics and periodicals including Raw Vision.

After his death, Bowlin's Mississippi home, the Beautiful Holy Jewel Home of the Original Rhinestone Cowboy, was acquired by the Kohler Foundation, Inc. and was moved to the John Michael Kohler Arts Center in Sheboygan, Wisconsin, where it is on permanent display.

References

Further reading
Marbling: A Complete Guide to Creating Beautiful Patterned Papers and Fabrics [Paperback]Diane Vogel Maurer (Author), Paul Maurer (Author)
Zeiger, Dinah. (1999) "Hey Rhinestone Cowboy! Dinah Zeiger enters the 'Beautiful Holy Jewel Home of the Original Rhinestone Cowboy'." Raw Vision (39)
Auer, James. (April 19, 2000) "All that Glitters was Gold to Entertainer." The Milwaukee Journal Sentinel.
Kohler Art Center: Fever dreams and utopian nightmares. July 25, 2006.

External links
John Michael Kohler Arts Center - Loy Bowlin
Hey Rhinestone Cowboy!

1909 births
1995 deaths
People from Franklin County, Mississippi
Artists from Mississippi
Outsider artists
People from McComb, Mississippi